Pyramus and Thisbe are a pair of ill-fated lovers whose story forms part of Ovid's Metamorphoses. The story has since been retold by many authors.

Story 
Pyramus and Thisbe are two lovers in the city of Babylon who occupy connected houses. Their respective parents, driven by rivalry, forbid them to wed. Through a crack in one of the walls they whisper their love for each other. They arrange to meet near a tomb under a mulberry tree and state their feelings for each other. Thisbe arrives first, but upon seeing a lioness with a bloody mouth from a recent kill, she flees, leaving behind her cloak. When Pyramus arrives, he is horrified at the sight of Thisbe's cloak: the lioness had torn it and left traces of blood behind, as well as its tracks. Assuming that a wild beast has killed her, Pyramus kills himself, falling on his sword, a typical Babylonian way to commit suicide, and in turn splashing blood on the white mulberry leaves. Pyramus's blood stains the white mulberry fruits, turning them dark. Thisbe returns, eager to tell Pyramus what had happened to her, but she finds Pyramus's dead body under the shade of the mulberry tree. Thisbe, after praying to their parents and the gods to have them buried together and a brief period of mourning, stabs herself with the same sword. In the end, the gods listen to Thisbe's lament, and forever change the colour of the mulberry fruits into the stained colour to honor forbidden love. Pyramus and Thisbe proved to be faithful lovers to each other until the very end.

Origins
Ovid's is the oldest surviving version of the story, published in 8 AD, but he adapted an existing aetiological myth. While in Ovid's telling Pyramus and Thisbe lived in Babylon, and Ctesias had placed the tomb of his imagined king Ninus near that city, the myth probably originated in Cilicia (part of Ninus' Babylonian empire) as Pyramos is the historical Greek name of the local Ceyhan River. The metamorphosis in the primary story involves Pyramus changing into this river and Thisbe into a nearby spring. A 2nd-century mosaic unearthed near Nea Paphos on Cyprus depicts this older version of the myth. This alternative version also survives in the progymnasmata, a work by Nicolaus Sophista, a Greek sophist and rhetor who lived during the fifth century AD.

Adaptations

The story of Pyramus and Thisbe appears in Giovanni Boccaccio's On Famous Women as biography number twelve (sometimes thirteen) and in his Decameron, in the fifth story on the seventh day, where a desperate housewife falls in love with her neighbor, and communicates with him through a crack in the wall, attracting his attention by dropping pieces of stone and straw through the crack.

In the 1380s, Geoffrey Chaucer, in his The Legend of Good Women, and John Gower, in his Confessio Amantis, were the first to tell the story in English. Gower altered the story somewhat into a cautionary tale. John Metham's Amoryus and Cleopes (1449) is another early English adaptation.

The tragedy of Romeo and Juliet ultimately sprang from Ovid's story. Here the star-crossed lovers cannot be together because Juliet has been engaged by her parents to another man and the two families hold an ancient grudge. As in Pyramus and Thisbe, the mistaken belief in one lover's death leads to consecutive suicides. The earliest version of Romeo and Juliet was published in 1476 by Masuccio Salernitano, while it mostly obtained its present form when written down in 1524 by Luigi da Porto. Salernitano and Da Porto both are thought to have been inspired by Ovid and Boccaccio's writing. Shakespeare's most famous 1590s adaptation is a dramatization of Arthur Brooke's 1562 poem The Tragical History of Romeus and Juliet, itself a translation of a French translation of Da Porto's novella.

In Shakespeare's A Midsummer Night's Dream (Act V, sc 1), a comedy written in the 1590s, a group of "mechanicals" enact the story of "Pyramus and Thisbe". Their production is crude and, for the most part, badly done until the final monologues of Nick Bottom, as Pyramus and Francis Flute, as Thisbe. The theme of forbidden love is also present in A Midsummer Night's Dream (albeit a less tragic and dark representation) in that a girl, Hermia, is not able to marry the man she loves, Lysander, because her father Egeus despises him and wishes for her to marry Demetrius, and meanwhile Hermia and Lysander are confident that Helena is in love with Demetrius.

The Beatles performed a humorous performance of “Pyramus and Thisbe” on the 1964 television special Around the Beatles. Primarily based around William Shakespeare's adaptation, the performance featured Paul McCartney as Pyramus, John Lennon as his lover Thisbe, George Harrison as Moonshine, and Ringo Starr as Lion, with Trevor Peacock in the role of Quince.

Spanish poet Luis de Góngora wrote a Fábula de Píramo y Tisbe in 1618, while French poet Théophile de Viau wrote Les amours tragiques de Pyrame et Thisbée, a tragedy in five acts, in 1621.

In 1718 Giuseppe Antonio Brescianello wrote his only opera, La Tisbe, for Württemberg court. François Francoeur and François Rebel composed Pirame et Thisbé, a lyric tragedy in five acts and a prologue, with libretto by Jean-Louis-Ignace de La Serre; it was played at the Académie royale de musique, on October 17, 1726. The story was adapted by John Frederick Lampe as a "Mock Opera" in 1745, containing a singing "Wall" which was described as "the most musical partition that was ever heard." In 1768 in Vienna, Johann Adolph Hasse composed a serious opera on the tale, titled Piramo e Tisbe.

Edmond Rostand adapted the tale, making the fathers of the lovers conspire to bring their children together by pretending to forbid their love, in Les Romanesques, whose 1960 musical adaptation, The Fantasticks, became the world's longest-running musical.

Pyramus and Thisbe were featured in The Simpsons 2012 episode "The Daughter Also Rises". Nick and Lisa's misunderstood love was compared to Thisbe and Pyramus’ forbidden love. Much like the crack in the wall, Lisa and Nick met through a crack between two booths in an Italian restaurant. Lisa and Nick are portrayed as the two characters during a later portion of the episode. They go to finish off their story and head for the tree under which Pyramus and Thisbe's fate presented itself.

In art

See also

 Latin literature
 Pyramus and Thisbe Club, a UK organisation concerned with party wall legislation
 Star-crossed

Citations

General references

Primary sources 
 Ovid, Metamorphoses iv.55–166

Secondary sources 
 Bulfinch, Thomas, The Age of Fable; Or, Stories of Gods and Heroes (2nd ed.), Sanborn, Carter, and Bazin, 1856

External links

 Pyramus and Thisbe: Carlos Parada, Greek Mythology link
 pXt A visual novel adaptation of the story from A Midsummer Night's Dream
 Queen Leer: Why, Thisbe? (Song and music video)

Ancient Cilicia
Characters in Greek mythology
Mythological lovers
Mythological duos
Metamorphoses characters
Metamorphoses into bodies of water in Greek mythology
Babylon in fiction